Xiao Bawang may be:
 Subor, a video game console manufacturer
 Little Bawang, a character in Born Red

See also
 Little emperor syndrome